This is a list of awards and nominations received by Nora Aunor. She has been awarded and nominated for her performances in film, television, stage and music which span 50 years. She is the most nominated and awarded actress of the Philippines, with over 200 awards for her singing and acting career.

Aunor has been awarded, recognized and received multiple nominations from different organizations, academe, institutions, critics and award giving bodies for her work in film, television, music and theater. She rose to prominence after winning the 1967 Tawag ng Tanghalan. She is the most nominated actress for the leading role in the long history of FAMAS Awards, having been nominated 17 times since 1973 when she was nominated for Gift of Love but only second to Eddie Garcia with 23 nominations both in leading and supporting role. With her fifth FAMAS Award for Best Actress in 1991, Aunor became the sixth performer to be elevated to the FAMAS Hall of Fame joining the likes of Eddie Garcia, Joseph Estrada, Charito Solis, Fernando Poe Jr. and Vilma Santos. This award is given to the person who won more than five times in its particular category. Aunor is the only performer in the long history of FAMAS Awards to be nominated for fifteen straight years, from 1973 to 1987.

As of 2017, Aunor is still the most nominated actress of Gawad Urian, with 21 nominations and seven wins, and the very first best actress awardee. She is also the most awarded and the most nominated actress of Metro Manila Film Festival, with eight best actress trophies, and from Young Critics Circle, with thirteen nominations and five wins. She is also the only actress to win the best actress trophy from the Film Academy of the Philippines for three straight years, a feat yet to be equaled or surpass by a Filipino actress.

In 1983, Aunor was recognized as one of The Outstanding Women in the Nation’s Service (TOWNS) in the field of the arts. In 1999, Aunor received the Centennial Honors for the Arts awarded by the Cultural Center of the Philippines (CCP). She was the only film actress included in the list of awardees. In 2010, she was hailed by the Green Planet Movie Awards as one of the "10 Asian Best Actresses of the Decade". She received the Ani ng Dangal Award (Harvest of Honors). from the National Commission for Culture and the Arts in 2013, 2014 and 2016.  In 2013, she received the Light of Culture Awards from Philippine Centre of the International Theatre Institute and the ITI-Earthsavers UNESCO Dream Center for pioneering in the integration of theater, television, and film. In 2014, Aunor was the recipient of University of the Philippines College of Mass Communications, Gawad Plaridel. On September 17, 2015, Aunor was conferred the Gawad CPP para sa Sining for Film and Broadcast Arts, the highest award given by the Cultural Center of the Philippines. She was also conferred the Gusi Peace Prize in 2015.

Aunor has the most international best actress awards and nominations of any Filipino actors. She is the only Filipino actress to win international awards from five different continents: 19th Cairo International Film Festival in 1995 (Africa), 1st East Asia Film and Television Award in 1997, Asian Film Awards in 2013 and 3rd Sakhalin International Film Festival (Asia), 31st Festival International du Film Indépendant de Bruxelles in 2004, Premio Della Critica Indipendiente in 2013  and St. Tropez International Film festival in 2015 (Europe), Asia Pacific Screen Award in 2013 (Australia) and the Green Planet Movie Award (North America).

Aunor has the most lifetime achievement awards received locally and internationally for her contribution to film, television, music, and theater.

As of June 10, 2022, Aunor was conferred the  The Order of National Artists of the Philippines.

State Honors

The Order of National Artists of the Philippines

TOWNS Foundation

Cultural Center of the Philippines (CCP)

National Centennial Commission

National Commission for Culture & the Arts (NCCA)

Office of the President (Philippines)

Philippine Center of the International Theatre Institute (PCITI)/ITI-Earthsavers UNESCO Dream Center

Patnubay ng Sining at Kalinangan - City of Manila

Gusi Peace Prize International

Recognition from the Academe

Far Eastern University

National Teachers College

De La Salle University

Ateneo de Naga University

Bicol University

Polytechnic University of the Philippines

Quezon City Public Teachers Association (QCPTS)/ACT

University of the Philippines Diliman

Holy Angel University

Philippine Women's University Communications Department

International awards and recognition

Best Actress awards and nominations

Lifetime achievement awards

Movie awards and recognition

FAMAS (Filipino Academy of Movie Arts and Sciences Awards)

 Nora Aunor was nominated for Best Actress for 15 straight years from 1973 - 1987.  She was elevated to the Hall of Fame after winning her fifth (5th) Best Actress Award in 1991.

Gawad Urian (Manunuri ng Pelikulang Pilipino)

Nora Aunor received the first-ever Best Actress Award from Gawad Urian. She is also the most nominated actress with 21 nominations to date.

Film Academy of the Philippines (Luna Awards)

 Nora Aunor is the youngest recipient of the Lifetime Achievement Award.  She is also the only Filipino actress to win three successive best actress awards (1990,1991,1992)and has the most wins with four (4) tied with Vilma Santos and Lorna Tolentino

Awards from the press

Nora Aunor received the first Best Actress Star Award from the Philippine Movie Press Club (PMPC). She is also the only actor to receive triple nominations in one award season.

Nora Aunor made a significant mark in the history of the Gawad GENIO Awards for winning Best Film Actress in two separate movies (Dementia and Hustisya) in 2015.

Film festival awards

Nora Aunor is the first and only Best Performer awardee of the Metro Manila Film Festival; it is equivalent to Best Actor, Best Actress, Best Supporting Actor and Actress Award. She is also the most awarded recipient of the Best Actress Award with 8 wins.

Critics' awards

For Tuos, Nora Aunor has double nomination; for single performance and Duo Performance
Nora Aunor received the very first Best Performer Award, She is also the most nominated with thirteen nominations and the winningest performer with 5 wins.

Awards from the Academe

 Aunor was the first recipient of the Best Actress Award

People's Choice Awards

Box Office Awards

Others

ref:

Aunor's first Best Actress nomination

Television awards and recognition

Golden Screen TV Awards (ENPRESS)

Philippine Academy for Television Arts and Sciences (PATAS Sinag Awards)

Star Awards for Television (Philippine Movie Press Club)

Other TV awards

Theater awards and recognition

Aliw Awards

Philippine Educational Theater Association (PETA)

PUP Teatro Batangas Artistic Awards

Music awards and recognition

Awit Awards

The first award ceremony was organized by the Awit Awards Executive Committee. After that, the Philippine Academy of Recording Arts and Sciences (PARAS) took charge the next 2 years. Since 1989, it was spearheaded by PARI (The Philippine Association of the Record Industry, Inc.)

Katha Award

Organisasyon ng Pilipinong Mang-aawit (OPM)

Philippine Recording Distributors Association (PREDA)

Star Awards for Music (Philippine Movie Press Club)

Awards from government agencies, civic organization and private entities

2015 - Best Actress, Dementia - 1st Urduja Heritage Film Awards - Province of Pangasinan
2015 - ANG ESPADA NI URDUJA - Kampeon ng Sining ng Pelikula Lifetime Achievement Award - 2015 Urduja Film Festival, Province of Pangasinan - October 15, 2015
2015 - Diwa ng Lahi Award Patnubay ng Sining at Kalinangan 2015 - 444th Araw ng Maynila
2015 - Senate Resolution No. 1270 Congratulating & Commending for her ASEAN IFF Lifetime Ach. Award - filed by Sen. Lito Lapid - Senate of the Philippines - May 19, 2015
2015 - Gawad Lasallian Para Sa Sining - De La Salle University - April 27, 2015
2015 - Outstanding Asian Actress & Movie Icon, 26th Asia Pacific Excellence Awards - April 9, 2015, AFP Theatre
2015 - Bulawan ng Bikolnon Service Award, Ateneo de Naga University
2015 - Honorary Nagueña - Naga City, Bicol
2015 -ONRA Citation (Bicol term for Honor) - given by Ako Bicol Partylist - Bicol University, Legazpi City, Albay. March 24, 2015
2015 - Pambansang Artista ng Bayan, Communications Dept, Bicol University - Legazpi City, Albay, March 24, 2015
2014 - Honorary Paoayan - Paoay, Ilocos Norte, March 2014
2014 - Pinakamagaling na Aktres sa Kasaysayan ng Pelikulang Pilipino - 1st Inding Indie Short Film Festival - Nat'l Press Club - Dec. 15, 2014
2014 - Overseas Filipino Worker's Choice as National Artist - 4th OFW Gawad Parangal - Dec. 12, 2014
2014 - Manuel L. Quezon Gawad Parangal, One of the 12 Outstanding Citizens of Q.C. - 75th Foundation Day - October 12, 2014.
2014 - Artista ng Mamamayan - Far Eastern University (FEU), Sept. 3, 2014, FEU
2014 - Natatanging Pagkilala Bilang Mahusay na Alagad ng Sining - Polytechnic University of the Philippines (PUP) - August 29, 2014, PUP, Manila
2014 - Tunay na Alagad ng Sining - Quezon City Public Teachers Association (QCPTS)/ACT - Quezon City Day, August 19, 2014, R. Magsaysay High School, Cubao, QC
2014 - Numero Uno Cinema One Icon Award - Cinema One 20th Anniversary - August 3, 2014, Samsung Hall, SM Aura
2014 - Artista ng Bayan - Gabriela, July 3, 2014
2014 - PEPster's Female Showbiz Treasure of the Year - PEP - May 20, 2014, Solaire Resort and Casino
2014 - Plaque of Appreciation - As Special Guest of Honor, Unveiling & Dedication Ceremony Letras Y Figuras de Bustos, Municipality of Bustos, Bulacan - April 7, 2014
2013 - People of the Year - People Asia Magazine
2013 - Special Recognition - 4th Indie Bravo Awards - Philippine Daily Inquirer
2013 - Thespic Excellence Award - Lyceum of the Philippines University - Batangas
2013 - Film Prize Award - 1st Kakulay Entertainment Showcase Awards
2013 - Gold Excellence Award - 1st Kakulay Entertainment Showcase Awards
2013 - Top Icon Awardee - 1st Kakulay Entertainment Showcase Awards
2013 - Best Female Artist (Veteran Category) - Pasikatan 2013 - Cinema One Global
2012 - 100 Most Beautiful Stars - Yes Magazine
2012 - Pinoy of the Year (2012) - VoicePoints Social Media Awards
2012 - Star of the Night - 38th Metro Manila Film Festival
2012 - Special Recognition - 3rd Indie Bravo Awards - Philippine Daily Inquirer
2011 - Asia's Female Entertainer, Icon of the Philippines - 13th Annual Global Excellence Award
2011 - Originals in Philippine Cinema - 7th Cinema One Originals Digital Film Festival
2009 - One of 15 Cinema One Legends - 5th Cinema One Originals Digital Film Festival
2007 - Milestone Lifetime Achievement Award - 19th Reflections Awards - Los Angeles, California, USA
2006 - Certificate of Recognition (Phenomenal Talent & Extraordinary Performer) - Office of the Governor, Las Vegas, USA
2006 -	Plaque of Appreciation - Nora Aunor Day - September 23, 2006 - Office of the Mayor, Killeen City, Texas, USA
2004 -	Plaque of Appreciation - Nora Aunor Day - May 21, 2004 - Office of Mayor Gavin Newson, San Francisco City, California USA
2002 - Trophy of Citation For Her Accomplishments in the Performing Arts & Contribution to Phil. Society - Holy Angel University, Pampanga
2001 - Entertainment's Tough 40 - One of the 40 Most Powerful Celebrities - Solid Link Corp.
2001 -	Best Female Entertainer for Superstar Beyond Time - 3rd Celebrity Award, Burbank Casways
1999 - Outstanding Film, Stage Actress & Artist - Sumagang Award - Iriga's 31st Charter Foundation Anniversary
1999 - Gawad Sentenaryo, Sektor ng Kababaihan, Sining at Kalinangan - National Centennial Commission
1997 - Plaque of Appreciation For Her Invaluable Contributions to the Phil. Entertainment Industry - Araneta Center 
1997 - Haligi ng Industriya Award - Film Development Foundation of the Philippines 
1997 - National Music Festival Award - Sandiwa Philippines
1997 -	Certificate of Appreciation as Guest Artist for Pasko '97 - Department of Foreign Affairs
1997 -	People's Award, Filipino Community - Waseda University, Tokyo, Japan	 	
1996 -	Plaque of Recognition - Eastern Telecommunications (Eastern Cable) Philippines
1996 - One of the 12 Outstanding Filipino Personalities in Literary (Field of Arts) - Gawad Quezon - Q.C. Gov't. 
1996 - Global Recognition Award for Exemplary Contributions to the Upliftment of Philippine Performing Arts - CityNet, Ch. 27 
1996 - Parangal ng Bayan Award (Film) - Office of the President 
1996 - Par Excellence Award - Philippine Association of Teachers of Culture & Arts 
1996 - Super Achiever Award - Eye to Eye, GMA-7 
1996 - Newsmaker of the Year - PMPC Star Awards for Movies
1996 -	Super Achiever Award - Eye to Eye, GMA 7
1996 -	Showbiz Lingo Darling Award - Showbiz Lingo, 4th Anniversary, ABS-CBN
1995 -	Plaque of Appreciation - Graphic Arts Services, Inc. (GASI)
1995 -	Plaque of Appreciation - international recognition at the Cairo Film Festival, GMA Supershow
1995 - Best Stage Actress for her works in Minsa'y Isang Gamu-Gamo and DH - PUP Teatro Batangas
1995 - Araw ng Maynila Award (Sining sa Pagganap) - City Gov't. of Manila
1995 - Plaque of Recognition (Int'l. Achievement As An Actress) - Communications Arts Department - Philippine Women's University (PWU) 
1995 - Grand Achievement Award - Parangal ng Bayan - Office of the President
1995 - Gold Record Award (Kahit Konting Awa the Album) - Viva Records
1993 -	Queen of Pinoy Showbiz - Hot Stars Daily Specials
1993 -	Jacksonville Award- Outstanding Contribution in the Dev. of Fil. Culture - Filipino-American Community of Florida, USA
1992 -	Super Sikat Drama Actress - Diyaryo Filipino
1992 -	Lifesize Statue, Tribute to Nora Aunor - Grand Alliance for Nora Aunor Philippines
1992 -	Queen Of Pinoy Showbiz - Hot Stars Daily Specials
1992 -	Super Movie Queen - Mass Media Publications
1992 -	Star of The Night - Star Awards for TV (PMPC)
1992 -	Plaque of Recognition - Acts & Deeds w/ Virtues of a True Apostolate of the Twin Hearts of Jesus - Twin Hearts Center for Peace
1991 - Best Performer - Joel David Awards for Excellence in Phil. Cinema
1991 - Gold Record Award (Langit Pala ang Umibig the Album) - Aguilar Music Corp.
1991 - Gold Record Award (Handog ni Guy LIVE, the Album) - Universal Records
1991 -	Queen of Pinoy Showbiz - Hot Star Daily Special
1990 - Hall of Fame, Young Achiever Award, Parangal ng Bayan - Office of the President
1989 -	One of the Seven Outstanding Actresses - Movie Flash
1989 -	One of the Seven Outstanding TV Shows, Superstar - Movie Flash
1988 - Young Achiever Award - Golden Scroll - National Youth & Young Professional Council
1986 -	Mother Actress of the Year - Regal Films
1985 - Newsmaker of the Year - PMPC Star Award for Movies
1985 - All time Favorite Award - Most Popular Stars '85 - Extra Hot Magazine, Jingle Songhits
1985 -	Special Award, Tribute to the Superstar - Big Ike's Happening
1983 -	Bicol Heritage Award - Outstanding Daughter of Iriga - Government of Iriga City
1983 - One of The 10 Outstanding Women in the Nation's Service (Field of Arts) - TOWNS
1981 -	Most Popular Love Team (Guy and Pip)	 	
1981 -	Paborito ng Press - PMPC
1980 -	Real Queen of Philippine Movies - BAMCI Promotions
1980 -	Number One (One-on-one for No.1) - Kislap Magazine
1980 -	Paborito ng Press - PMPC
1977 -	Guy, A Symbol of Love - PMPC
1975 -	Trophy of Appreciation (for the fundraising campaign MAMERA KAY NORA) - National Center for Mental Health
1975 -	Most Popular Actress - PMPC
1975 -	Most Outstanding Movie Star and Producer - Big Ike's Happening
1975 -	Most Popular Star - Eddie Ilagan
1974 - Queen of Northern Luzon for 100 Hit Records
1973 - Miss RP Movies
1973 - Bb. Pilipinas ng Pelikulang At Awiting Pilipino
1973 -	Most Popular Star of the Year - PMPC
1973 -	Most Charitable Young Actress - Sixteen MOD
1972 -	Plaque of Appreciation (for helping in the fundraising campaign for the restoration of the Bamboo Organ) - City of Las Pinas
1972 -	Most Popular Actress	 	
1972 -	Queen of Stars (Sino ang Sikat?) - Movie Life
1971 -	Plaque of Appreciation - Jose P. Laurel Memorial Foundation Inc., Tanauan, Batangas
1971 -	Certificate of Appreciation - Mabini Memorial University, Iriga, Camarines Sur
1971 -	Popularity Contest - Associated Broadcasting Corporation
1971 -	Most Popular Star of 1970-71 - Atlas Publications
1971 -	2nd Place, Most Popular Love Team: Nora-Tirso - Liwayway Publications
1971 -	3rd Place, Most Popular Love Team: Nora-Manny - Liwayway Publications
1971 -	5th Place, Most Popular Love Team: Nora-Novo - Liwayway Publications
1971 -	Trophy of Appreciation, 2nd Anniversary of Guy and Pip - Liwayway Publications
1971 -	Queen of Stars - Mix Publications
1971 -	KBS Lucky Star Dial Soap - Mondragon
1971 - Box Office Queen - Spotlight Promotions
1971 -	One of the Top Ten Best Dressed Females - Spotlight Promotions Stars
1970 - Singer for the Months of February, March, and April - DWOW Radio
1970 - Best Female Singer in English - Philippine Academy of Recording Arts and Sciences
1970 -	3rd Place, Sino Ang Sikat? - Mix Publications
1970 -	Miss Philippine Movies '70s - People's Choice Awards
1969 - Favorite Singer of Northern Luzon - Eagle Broadcasting Corporation, Dagupan City
1969 -	Miss Showbusiness (Radio, TV and Stage) - Danny Holmes Publications
1969 -	Most Promising Star of Tomorrow	- Pablo S. Gomez Publications
1969 -	Lakambini ng Sampaguita - Sampaguita Pictures
1969 -	6th Place (Top Radio & TV Female) - Top Magazine Personality
1968 - 8th Place, Miss Showbusiness
1967 - GRAND CHAMPION, TAWAG NG TANGHALAN
1966 - Certificate of Honor, First Prize Darigold Jamboree, Naga City
1965 - Winner (14 weeks) Darigold Bulilit Contest
1964 - Certificate of Honor, First Prize Liberty Big Show, Camarines Sur

Notes
 Shared with Sharon Cuneta for Crying Ladies.
 Shared with Sharon Cuneta for Dapat ka Bang Mahalin.
 Shared with Sharon Cuneta for Madrasta.
 Shared with Helen Gamboa for Bagong Bayani.
 Shared with Vilma Santos for Pahiram ng Isang Umaga.
 Shared with Gina Alajar for Brutal.
 Shared with Aga Muhlach for Hindi Kita Malilimutan.
 Shared with Aga Muhlach for Joey Boy Munti.
 Shared with Valerie Garcia for Lauriana and Alice Dixson for When the Love Is Gone.
 Shared with Angelica Panganiban for That Thing Called Tadhana.
 Shared with Helen Gamboa for Walang Hanggan.
 Shared with Vilma Santos for Vilma.

See also

List of people who won the Philippine showbiz grand slam
Nora Aunor filmography

References

External links 
 The Artistry of Nora Aunor
 
 

Awards
Lists of awards received by Filipino actor
Lists of awards received by Filipino musician